Zarbil may refer to:
 Zarbil, East Azerbaijan
 Zarbil, Gilan